Muhayer Oktay (born 28 April 1999) is a footballer who plays for Beşiktaş. Born in Germany, he is a youth international for Turkey.

Club career
On 17 January 2019, Oktay joined Süper Lig outfit Beşiktaş with a four-and-a-half-season-long contract from German side Fortuna Düsseldorf. On 23 August 2019, Oktay made his Süper Lig debut at 2019–20 season week 2 home-encounter against Göztepe, ended 3–0 in favour of Beşiktaş.

References

External links
 Profile at TFF
 

1999 births
Living people
Sportspeople from Hagen
Turkish footballers
Turkey youth international footballers
German footballers
German people of Turkish descent
Beşiktaş J.K. footballers
Süper Lig players
Association football midfielders
Footballers from North Rhine-Westphalia